Harold "Money" Johnson (February 23, 1918 – March 28, 1978) was an American jazz trumpeter.

Early life
Johnson was born in Tyler, Texas, on February 23, 1918. He first played trumpet at age 15. Primarily a trumpeter, he also recorded with the trombone in a few instances and subsequently the flugelhorn and flute, respectively.

Later life and career
He moved to Oklahoma City in 1936 and jammed with Charlie Christian and Henry Bridges before joining Nat Towles's band. He played with Horace Henderson and Bob Dorsey before returning to Towles's band in 1944 in Chicago. He also played with Count Basie, Cootie Williams, Lucky Millinder, and Bull Moose Jackson in the 1940s.  His associations in the 1950s included Louis Jordan (1951), Lucky Thompson (1953), Sy Oliver, Buddy Johnson, Cozy Cole, Mercer Ellington, Little Esther (1956), and Panama Francis (for performances in Uruguay in 1953).

In the 1960s Johnson played in the house band at the Apollo Theater in New York, and recorded with King Curtis in 1962. He toured the USSR with Earl Hines in 1966. From 1968 he played in the Duke Ellington Orchestra and also worked again with Hines and Oliver. He recorded with Buck Clayton in 1975. Johnson's last performance was on the night before he died of a heart attack, which was on March 28, 1978, in New York City.

Discography
Year of release, rather than recording is indicated.
With Pearl Bailey
1944-1947 (Classics, 2002)
Takes Two To Tango (ASV/Living Era, 2004)
With Cozy Cole
Cozy Cole/Savina (Love, 2005)
With Buck Clayton
Buck Clayton Jam Session (Chiaroscuro, 1975)
With King Curtis
Blow Man, Blow! (Bear Family, 1992)
With Duke Ellington
Second Sacred Concert (Prestige, 1968)
New Orleans Suite (Atlantic, 1970)
The Afro-Eurasian Eclipse (Original Jazz Classics, 1971)
Up In Duke's Workshop (Original Jazz Classics, 1972)
The Ellington Suites: The Queen's Suite/The Goutelas Suite/The Uwis Suite (Pablo/Original Jazz Classics, released 1976)
The Intimate Ellington (Concord, 1977)
Private Collection, Vol. 9: Studio Sessions, New York (Saja, 1989)
Private Collection, Vol. 10 (Saja, 1989)
Never Before Released Recordings 1965-1972 (Musicmasters, 1991)
Cool Rock (Laserlight, 1992)
Berlin '65/Paris '67 (Pablo, 1997)
Togo Brava Suite (Storyville, 2001)
Live & Rare (Bluebird RCA, 2002)
Rugged Jungle (Lost Secret, 2004)
New York, NY (Storyville, 2008)
Live in Warsaw October 30, 1971 (Gambit, 2009)
Last Trip To Paris: Nov 14 1973 (City Hall, 2013)
Mara Gold (Squatty Roo, 2014)
With Duke Ellington Orchestra / Mercer Ellington
Continuum (Fantasy, 1975)
With Louis Jordan
Let the Good Times Roll (Imports, 1992)
Let The Good Times Roll: The Anthology 1938-1953 (MCA, 1999)
With Barbara Lewis
Hello Stranger: The Best of Barbara Lewis (Rhino, 1994)
With Jack McDuff
A Change Is Gonna Come/Double Barrelled Soul (Atlantic, 1966)
With Bull Moose Jackson
1945-1947 (Classics, 2003)
With Lucky Millinder
Back Beats (Pearl, 1996)
1943-1947 (Classics, 1999)
With Houston Person
Houston Express (Prestige, 1970)
Legends Of Acid Jazz (Prestige, 1996)
With Red Prysock
Swingsation (Verve, 1999)
With Jesse Stone
Jesse Stone Alias Charles "Chuck" Calhoun (Bear Family, 1996)
With Lucky Thompson
Lucky Moments (Ocium, 2003)
With Eddie "Cleanhead" Vinson
Primary Cuts, Vol. 1 (Catfish, 2000)
With Cootie Williams and His Orchestra
1945-1946 (Classics, 1999)
Big Bands At The Savoy (and Luis Russell, Allegro, 1999)

References

1918 births
1978 deaths
20th-century American musicians
American jazz trumpeters
American male trumpeters
Duke Ellington Orchestra members
Musicians from Texas
People from Tyler, Texas
American male jazz musicians
20th-century American male musicians